The San Antonio Botanical Garden is a , non-profit botanical garden in San Antonio, Texas, United States, and the city's official botanical garden.

History
The Garden was first conceived in the 1940's by Mrs. R. R. Witt and Mrs. Joseph Murphy, who organized the San Antonio Garden Center.  The two went on to develop a master plan for a city botanical center in the late 1960's.  The site of the master plan was a former limestone quarry and waterworks area owned by the city. Voters approved $265,000 in bonds in 1970, which was the catalyst for funding the new gardens.  Ground was broken for the new facilities on July 21, 1976, and the San Antonio Botanical Gardens officially opened to the public on May 3, 1980.

The Garden has had two major additions since opening.  On February 29, 1988 the Emilio Ambasz designed Lucile Halsell Conservatory opened to the public and later that same year the historic Sullivan Carriage House was moved brick by brick to the Garden.  Restoration of the building began in 1992 with formal dedication in 1995.
In 2017 with support from its $40 million GROW capital campaign, the Garden expanded eight acres. Complementing the existing Garden through a new entrance experience, a culinary garden and outdoor kitchen for teaching health and wellness, and a family adventure garden promoting nature play.

Features
Today the garden consists of the Lucile Halsell Conservatory, formal and display gardens, native gardens, an overlook tower and the Sullivan Carriage House:
 Lucile Halsell Conservatory (1988) - Designed by award-winning, Argentinian architect Emilio Ambasz this subterranean structure consists of five climate specific greenhouses surrounding a central courtyard.  Specimens housed in the structure include alpine plants, aquatic plants, cacti and succulents, carnivorous plants, epiphytes, ferns and aroids, tropical fruits, and palms and cycads.  The building won several architectural design awards.
 Gardens - Mays Family Display Garden, The Zachry Foundation Culinary Garden, Sensory Garden, Kumamoto En, Rose and Old Fashioned Garden, Sacred Garden, Cactus and Succulent Garden, Children's Vegetable Garden, Family Adventure Garden, Watersaver Garden, and Wisteria Arbor. 
 Texas Native Trail - plants and structures from the East Texas piney woods, Texas Hill Country, and South Texas.
 Sullivan Carriage House (originally constructed 1896, relocated 1988) - designed by noted architect Alfred Giles for banker Daniel J. Sullivan.  The structure was relocated, brick by brick, in 1988 from its original location in downtown San Antonio to the Botanical Gardens.  The building was fully restored and dedicated in 1995.  The structure now serves as the main entrance to the gardens and its former stables and carriage house contain a restaurant, gift shop, offices as well as event and meeting space.

Gallery

See also 
 List of botanical gardens in the United States

References

External links

 San Antonio Botanical Garden

Botanical gardens in Texas
Geography of San Antonio
Tourist attractions in San Antonio
Parks in San Antonio
Protected areas of Bexar County, Texas
Buildings and structures in San Antonio
Greenhouses in Texas
Japanese gardens in the United States